Volvarina monilis is a species of sea snail, a marine gastropod mollusk in the family Marginellidae, the margin snails.

Description

Distribution

References

 Vine, P. (1986). Red Sea Invertebrates. Immel Publishing, London. 224 pp.
 Boyer F. (2015). Révision des marginelles de Linné (Mollusques prosobranches : Marginellidae et Cystiscidae). Xenophora Taxonomy. 8: 33-55
 Cossignani T. (2006). Marginellidae & Cystiscidae of the World. L'Informatore Piceno. 408pp
 Boyer F. (2017). Révision des Marginellidae du Récifal supérieur de l'île de Masirah (Oman). Xenophora Taxonomy. 17: 3-31

External links
 Linnaeus, C. (1758). Systema Naturae per regna tria naturae, secundum classes, ordines, genera, species, cum characteribus, differentiis, synonymis, locis. Editio decima, reformata
 Petit de la Saussaye S. (1851). Notice sur le genre Marginelle, Marginella, Lamarck, suivie d'un catalogue synonymique des espèces de ce genre. Journal de Conchyliologie. 2: 38-59
 Jousseaume F. (1875). Coquilles de la famille des marginelles. Monographie. Revue et Magazin de Zoologie. ser. 3, 3: 164-271; 429-435

Marginellidae
Gastropods described in 1758
Taxa named by Carl Linnaeus